The following species in the flowering plant genus Vaccinium, containing the cranberries, blueberries, bilberries (whortleberries), lingonberries (cowberries), and huckleberries, are accepted by Plants of the World Online. This taxon is highly polyphyletic.

Vaccinium absconditum 
Vaccinium acrobracteatum 
Vaccinium acutissimum 
Vaccinium adenochaetum 
Vaccinium adenotrichum 
Vaccinium agusanense 
Vaccinium aitapense 
Vaccinium alainii 
Vaccinium albicans 
Vaccinium albidens 
Vaccinium almedae 
Vaccinium altiterrae 
Vaccinium alvarezii 
Vaccinium amakhangium 
Vaccinium amazonicum 
Vaccinium ambivalens 
Vaccinium amblyandrum 
Vaccinium amphoterum 
Vaccinium amplexicaule 
Vaccinium ampullaceum 
Vaccinium angiense 
Vaccinium angustifolium 
Vaccinium apiculatum 
Vaccinium apophysatum 
Vaccinium appendiculatum 
Vaccinium arboreum 
Vaccinium arbutoides 
Vaccinium arctostaphylos 
Vaccinium ardisioides 
Vaccinium aristatum 
Vaccinium artum 
Vaccinium × atlanticum 
Vaccinium aucupis 
Vaccinium auriculifolium 
Vaccinium bancanum 
Vaccinium banksii 
Vaccinium barandanum 
Vaccinium barbatum 
Vaccinium bartlettii 
Vaccinium beamanianum 
Vaccinium benguetense 
Vaccinium besagiense 
Vaccinium bissei 
Vaccinium blepharocalyx 
Vaccinium bocatorense 
Vaccinium bodenii 
Vaccinium boninense 
Vaccinium boreale 
Vaccinium brachyandrum 
Vaccinium brachybotrys 
Vaccinium brachycladum 
Vaccinium brachygyne 
Vaccinium brachytrichum 
Vaccinium bracteatum 
Vaccinium brassii 
Vaccinium breedlovei 
Vaccinium brevipedicellatum 
Vaccinium brevipedunculatum 
Vaccinium × brunoense 
Vaccinium bullatum 
Vaccinium bulleyanum 
Vaccinium caesariense 
Vaccinium calycinum 
Vaccinium camiguinense 
Vaccinium campanense 
Vaccinium candidum 
Vaccinium capillatum 
Vaccinium cardiophorum 
Vaccinium carlesii 
Vaccinium carneolum 
Vaccinium × carolinianum 
Vaccinium caudatum 
Vaccinium cavendishioides 
Vaccinium cavinerve 
Vaccinium cebuense 
Vaccinium centrocelebicum 
Vaccinium ceraceum 
Vaccinium ceramense 
Vaccinium cercidifolium 
Vaccinium cereum 
Vaccinium cespitosum 
Vaccinium chaetothrix 
Vaccinium chamaebuxus 
Vaccinium chengiae 
Vaccinium chihuahuense 
Vaccinium chimantense 
Vaccinium chlaenophyllum 
Vaccinium chunii 
Vaccinium ciliatum 
Vaccinium claoxylon 
Vaccinium clementis 
Vaccinium coelorum 
Vaccinium commutatum 
Vaccinium conchophyllum 
Vaccinium confertum 
Vaccinium consanguineum 
Vaccinium continuum 
Vaccinium contractum 
Vaccinium convallariiflorum 
Vaccinium convexifolium 
Vaccinium cordifolium 
Vaccinium coriaceum 
Vaccinium cornigerum 
Vaccinium corymbodendron 
Vaccinium corymbosum 
Vaccinium costaricense 
Vaccinium costerifolium 
Vaccinium craspedotum 
Vaccinium crassiflorum 
Vaccinium crassifolium 
Vaccinium crassistylum 
Vaccinium crassivenium 
Vaccinium crenatifolium 
Vaccinium crenatum 
Vaccinium crinigerum 
Vaccinium cruentum 
Vaccinium cubense 
Vaccinium culminicola 
Vaccinium cumingianum 
Vaccinium cuneifolium 
Vaccinium cuspidifolium 
Vaccinium cyclopense 
Vaccinium cylindraceum 
Vaccinium damingshanense 
Vaccinium daphniphyllum 
Vaccinium darrowii 
Vaccinium debilescens 
Vaccinium decumbens 
Vaccinium delavayi 
Vaccinium deliciosum 
Vaccinium dendrocharis 
Vaccinium densifolium 
Vaccinium dentatum 
Vaccinium dependens 
Vaccinium dialypetalum 
Vaccinium dictyoneuron 
Vaccinium didymanthum 
Vaccinium distichum 
Vaccinium × dobbinii 
Vaccinium dominans 
Vaccinium dubiosum 
Vaccinium duclouxii 
Vaccinium dunalianum 
Vaccinium dunnianum 
Vaccinium ekmanii 
Vaccinium elegans 
Vaccinium elliptifolium 
Vaccinium elvirae 
Vaccinium emarginatum 
Vaccinium empetrum 
Vaccinium endertii 
Vaccinium epiphyticum 
Vaccinium erythrocarpum 
Vaccinium euryanthum 
Vaccinium evanidinervium 
Vaccinium exaristatum 
Vaccinium exiguum 
Vaccinium exul 
Vaccinium eymae 
Vaccinium filipes 
Vaccinium fimbribracteatum 
Vaccinium fimbricalyx 
Vaccinium finisterrae 
Vaccinium floccosum 
Vaccinium floribundum 
Vaccinium foetidissiumum 
Vaccinium fragile 
Vaccinium fraternum 
Vaccinium furfuraceum 
Vaccinium gaultheriifolium 
Vaccinium geminiflorum 
Vaccinium gitingense 
Vaccinium gjellerupii 
Vaccinium glabrescens 
Vaccinium glandellatum 
Vaccinium glaucoalbum 
Vaccinium glaucophyllum 
Vaccinium globosum 
Vaccinium goodenoughii 
Vaccinium gracile 
Vaccinium gracilipes 
Vaccinium gracillimum 
Vaccinium grandibracteatum 
Vaccinium griffithianum 
Vaccinium guangdongense 
Vaccinium habbemae 
Vaccinium haematinum 
Vaccinium haematochroum 
Vaccinium × hagerupii 
Vaccinium hainanense 
Vaccinium haitangense 
Vaccinium halconense 
Vaccinium hamiguitanense 
Vaccinium hansmeyeri 
Vaccinium hatamense 
Vaccinium hellwigianum 
Vaccinium henryi 
Vaccinium hiepii 
Vaccinium hirsutum 
Vaccinium hirtum 
Vaccinium hispidulissimum 
Vaccinium hooglandii 
Vaccinium hopei 
Vaccinium horizontale 
Vaccinium × hybridum 
Vaccinium igneum 
Vaccinium imbricans 
Vaccinium impressinerve 
Vaccinium inconspicuum 
Vaccinium indutum 
Vaccinium insigne 
Vaccinium × intermedium 
Vaccinium iragaense 
Vaccinium iteophyllum 
Vaccinium jacobeanum 
Vaccinium jagorii 
Vaccinium japonicum 
Vaccinium jefense 
Vaccinium jevidalianum 
Vaccinium kachinense 
Vaccinium kengii 
Vaccinium kingdon-wardii 
Vaccinium kjellhergii 
Vaccinium korinchense 
Vaccinium korthalsii 
Vaccinium kostermansii 
Vaccinium kunthianum 
Vaccinium lageniforme 
Vaccinium lamellatum 
Vaccinium lamprophyllum 
Vaccinium lanigerum 
Vaccinium latifolium 
Vaccinium latissimum 
Vaccinium laurifolium 
Vaccinium leonis 
Vaccinium leptocladum 
Vaccinium leptomorphum 
Vaccinium leptospermoides 
Vaccinium leucanthum 
Vaccinium leucobotrys 
Vaccinium ligustrifolium 
Vaccinium littoreum 
Vaccinium longepedicellatum 
Vaccinium longicaudatum 
Vaccinium longiporum 
Vaccinium longisepalum 
Vaccinium loranthifolium 
Vaccinium lorentzii 
Vaccinium lucidum 
Vaccinium lundellianum 
Vaccinium luteynii 
Vaccinium luzoniense 
Vaccinium macgillivrayi 
Vaccinium macrocarpon 
Vaccinium madagascariense 
Vaccinium malacothrix 
Vaccinium mandarinorum 
Vaccinium manipurense 
Vaccinium × marianum 
Vaccinium mathewsii 
Vaccinium megalophyes 
Vaccinium membranaceum 
Vaccinium meridionale 
Vaccinium microcarpum 
Vaccinium microphyllum 
Vaccinium minusculum 
Vaccinium minuticalcaratum 
Vaccinium miquelii 
Vaccinium mjoebergii 
Vaccinium modestum 
Vaccinium molle 
Vaccinium monetarium 
Vaccinium monteverdense 
Vaccinium montis-ericae 
Vaccinium morobense 
Vaccinium motuoense 
Vaccinium moupinense 
Vaccinium muriculatum 
Vaccinium myodianum 
Vaccinium myrsinites 
Vaccinium myrsinoides 
Vaccinium myrtilloides 
Vaccinium myrtillus 
Vaccinium myrtoides 
Vaccinium nagamasu 
Vaccinium napoense 
Vaccinium neilgherrense 
Vaccinium nhatrangense 
Vaccinium nitens 
Vaccinium × nubigenum 
Vaccinium nummularia 
Vaccinium nuttallii 
Vaccinium obatapaquiniorum 
Vaccinium obedii 
Vaccinium oldhamii 
Vaccinium omeiense 
Vaccinium onimense 
Vaccinium oranjense 
Vaccinium oreites 
Vaccinium oreogenes 
Vaccinium oreomyrtus 
Vaccinium orosiense 
Vaccinium ortizii 
Vaccinium oscarlopezianum 
Vaccinium otophyllum 
Vaccinium ovalifolium 
Vaccinium ovatum 
Vaccinium oxycoccos 
Vaccinium pachydermum 
Vaccinium paddywoodsii 
Vaccinium padifolium 
Vaccinium palawanense 
Vaccinium pallidum 
Vaccinium papillatum 
Vaccinium papulosum 
Vaccinium paradisearum 
Vaccinium parvifolium 
Vaccinium parvulifolium 
Vaccinium paucicrenatum 
Vaccinium perrigidum 
Vaccinium petelotii 
Vaccinium philippinense 
Vaccinium phillippsiae 
Vaccinium phillyreoides 
Vaccinium piceifolium 
Vaccinium piliferum 
Vaccinium pilosilobum 
Vaccinium pipolyi 
Vaccinium platyphyllum 
Vaccinium poasanum 
Vaccinium podocarpoideum 
Vaccinium praeces 
Vaccinium praestans 
Vaccinium pratense 
Vaccinium prostratum 
Vaccinium psammogenes 
Vaccinium pseudobullatum 
Vaccinium pseudocaracasanum 
Vaccinium pseudocaudatum 
Vaccinium pseudodialypetalum 
Vaccinium pseudorobustum 
Vaccinium pseudospadiceum 
Vaccinium pseudotonkinense 
Vaccinium pterocalyx 
Vaccinium puberulum 
Vaccinium pubicalyx 
Vaccinium pugionifolium 
Vaccinium pullei 
Vaccinium pumilum 
Vaccinium quinquefidum 
Vaccinium racemosum 
Vaccinium randaiense 
Vaccinium rapae 
Vaccinium reticulatovenosum 
Vaccinium reticulatum 
Vaccinium retivenium 
Vaccinium retusifolium 
Vaccinium retusum 
Vaccinium rigidifolium 
Vaccinium roraimense 
Vaccinium roseiflorum 
Vaccinium rubescens 
Vaccinium rubroviolaceum 
Vaccinium sandsii 
Vaccinium sanguineum 
Vaccinium santafeense 
Vaccinium sarawakense 
Vaccinium saxatile 
Vaccinium saxicola 
Vaccinium scandens 
Vaccinium schlechterianum 
Vaccinium schoddei 
Vaccinium schultzei 
Vaccinium sciaphilum 
Vaccinium sclerophyllum 
Vaccinium scoparium 
Vaccinium scopulorum 
Vaccinium scortechinii 
Vaccinium scyphocalyx 
Vaccinium secundum 
Vaccinium selerianum 
Vaccinium serrulatum 
Vaccinium setipes 
Vaccinium shaferi 
Vaccinium shastense 
Vaccinium shikokianum 
Vaccinium sieboldii 
Vaccinium sikkimense 
Vaccinium simulans 
Vaccinium singularis 
Vaccinium sinicum 
Vaccinium smallii 
Vaccinium sororium 
Vaccinium spaniotrichum 
Vaccinium sparsicapillum 
Vaccinium sparsum 
Vaccinium sphyrospennoides 
Vaccinium spiculatum 
Vaccinium sprengelii 
Vaccinium stamineum 
Vaccinium stanleyi 
Vaccinium steinii 
Vaccinium stellae-montis 
Vaccinium stenanthum 
Vaccinium stenolobum 
Vaccinium stenophyllum 
Vaccinium steyermarkii 
Vaccinium striicaule 
Vaccinium subdissitifolium 
Vaccinium subfalcatum 
Vaccinium subulisepalum 
Vaccinium sumatranum 
Vaccinium summifaucis 
Vaccinium supracostatum 
Vaccinium sylvaticum 
Vaccinium symplocifolium 
Vaccinium talamancense 
Vaccinium tanjungii 
Vaccinium taxifolium 
Vaccinium tectiflorum 
Vaccinium tenellum 
Vaccinium tentaculatum 
Vaccinium tenuiflorum 
Vaccinium tenuipes 
Vaccinium thibaudifolium 
Vaccinium timonioides 
Vaccinium timorense 
Vaccinium tomicipes 
Vaccinium tonkinense 
Vaccinium trichocarpum 
Vaccinium trichocladum 
Vaccinium triflorum 
Vaccinium truncatocalyx 
Vaccinium tubiflorum 
Vaccinium turfosum 
Vaccinium uliginosum 
Vaccinium urceolatum 
Vaccinium urquiolae 
Vaccinium urubambense 
Vaccinium utteridgei 
Vaccinium vacciniaceum 
Vaccinium varingiifolium 
Vaccinium venosum 
Vaccinium versteegii 
Vaccinium vidalii 
Vaccinium vietnamense 
Vaccinium villosiflorum 
Vaccinium viridiflorum 
Vaccinium viscifolium 
Vaccinium vitis-idaea 
Vaccinium vonroemeri 
Vaccinium warburgii 
Vaccinium whiteanum 
Vaccinium whitfordii 
Vaccinium whitmeei 
Vaccinium whitmorei 
Vaccinium wilburii 
Vaccinium wisselianum 
Vaccinium wollastonii 
Vaccinium wondiwoiense 
Vaccinium woodianum 
Vaccinium wrightii 
Vaccinium xerampelinum 
Vaccinium yakushimense 
Vaccinium yaoshanicum 
Vaccinium yatabei 
Vaccinium youngii

References

Vaccinium